Moneilema longipes is a species of beetle in the family Cerambycidae. It was described by White in 1856.

References

Moneilemini
Beetles described in 1856